Jip Janssen (born 14 October 1997) is a Dutch field hockey player, who plays as a defender for Kampong and the Dutch national team.

Club career
In the Dutch Hoofdklasse, Janssen plays for SV Kampong. Before he joined Kampong he played in the youth ranks of Naarden.

International career

Under–21
In 2016, Janssen made his debut for the Netherlands U–21 side in a four nations tournament in Hannover, Germany.

Later that year, Janssen represented the side at the Junior World Cup in Lucknow, India. At the tournament, the Netherlands finished in seventh place.

Senior team
Janssen made his debut for the Netherlands senior national team in 2017, in a test match against South Africa in Cape Town. During the match, Janssen scored his first international goal in a 6–2 win. 

After his debut, Janssen did not represent the Dutch side again until 2019 during the inaugural tournament of the FIH Pro League. Janssen scored three times during the league, helping the Netherlands to a bronze medal. Janssen won another bronze medal in 2019 at the EuroHockey Nations Championship in Antwerp.

International goals

References

External links
 
 
 
 

1997 births
Living people
People from Naarden
Dutch male field hockey players
Male field hockey defenders
Men's Hoofdklasse Hockey players
SV Kampong players
Field hockey players at the 2020 Summer Olympics
Olympic field hockey players of the Netherlands
Sportspeople from North Holland
2023 Men's FIH Hockey World Cup players